Galaxy 27 is a communications satellite owned by Intelsat. It was at first located at 129° West longitude, serving most of the North America market. It was built by Space Systems/Loral, as part of its LS-1300 line. Galaxy 27 was formerly known as Intelsat Americas-7 and Telstar-7.

This satellite experienced a power failure of several days in 2004 and returned to service with reduced capacity.

In May 2011, Galaxy 27 was redeployed to 45.1° East longitude in order to expand Intelsat's services in the Middle East and Western Asia. In October 2013, Intelsat moved the satellite to an inclined orbit at 66° East. At its inclined orbit of 2.4° at 66° East, Galaxy 27 is in a collocated orbit with Intelsat 17.

References 

Communications satellites in geostationary orbit
Satellite television
Spacecraft launched in 1999
Satellites using the SSL 1300 bus